= OYAP Trust =

UK-based charity organization

OYAP Trust, formerly the Oxfordshire Youth Arts Partnership, was a UK-based charity involved in the education of young people through participation in the arts. OYAP aimed to develop skills, confidence and self-esteem and give vulnerable young people access to the creative arts, education, and training opportunities.

OYAP closed its venue in Bicester in December 2023 and the charity closed in 2025.
